César Batlle Pacheco (30 August 1885 – 5 June 1966) was a Uruguayan journalist and political figure.

Biography
Batlle was born in Montevideo into the distinguished Batlle family, the eldest son of Matilde Pacheco and José Batlle y Ordóñez, the three-time President of Uruguay (1899, 1903–07 and 1911–15).  His brothers were Rafael and Lorenzo Batlle Pacheco. He was of Catalan descent. He and his brothers grew up with his orphaned cousin, future Uruguayan president Luis Batlle Berres, on the Piedras Blancas estate outside Montevideo.

He was a journalist by profession and a prominent member of the Uruguayan Colorado Party, closely associated with El Día, the newspaper founded by his father.

In 1919, he served as president of Club Atlético Peñarol. In 1931, and between 1943 and 1952, he served as president of the Uruguayan Football Association

Political elections

He was elected a Deputy in 1951. From 1959 till 1963, he served as a minority member in the Consejo Nacional de Gobierno. He became a Senator in 1964. He died in Montevideo in 1966.

See also

 Politics of Uruguay
 List of political families#Uruguay

References

1885 births
1966 deaths
People from Montevideo
Uruguayan journalists
Batlle
Uruguayan people of Scottish descent
Children of presidents of Uruguay
National Council of Government (Uruguay)
Colorado Party (Uruguay) politicians
Members of the Senate of Uruguay
Peñarol
Uruguayan football chairmen and investors
Presidents of the Uruguayan Football Association
20th-century journalists